Bilka, is a village in northern Ukraine, located in Okhtyrka Raion of Sumy Oblast.

Geography 
The Boromlya River (a tributary of the Vorskla River) runs through the village. The city of Trostianets is 3 km downstream from the village.

History 
During the Holodomor from 1932-1933, more than 300 villagers died from starvation:.

The village was briefly occupied by Russian forces in March 2022 during the Russian invasion and subsequent large-scale war. Ukrainians recaptured the village following Russia's retreat from northern and northeastern Ukraine.

Demographics 
In the 1864 census, the population was 2,933, and by 1897 the population has increased to 3,354.

According to the 2001 Ukrainian Census, the native language distribution is as follows

 Ukrainian: 96.83%
 Russian: 2.86%
 Others: 0.19%

References 

Villages in Okhtyrka Raion